Kings Club Casino is a casino located in Brimley, Michigan, which opened in 1984. It was the first Tribally owned casino in the United States. It is owned and operated by the Bay Mills Indian Community.

History

Kings Club Casino was opened by the Bay Mills Indian Community on July 4, 1984. It was the first gaming facility owned by a Native American tribe in the United States to include slots and blackjack games instead of just bingo.<ref>

Features
Kings Club Casino features a  gaming floor with over 250 slot machines and a cafe.

See also

 Bay Mills Resort & Casino
 List of casinos in Michigan

References

External links

1984 establishments in Michigan
Buildings and structures in Chippewa County, Michigan
Casinos in Michigan
Casinos completed in 1984
Native American casinos
Tourist attractions in Chippewa County, Michigan
Native American history of Michigan